Ice VI is a form of ice that exists at high pressure at the order of about 1 GPa (= 10 000 bar) and temperatures ranging from 130 up to 355 Kelvin (−143 °C up to 82 °C); see also the phase diagram of water. Its discovery and the discovery of other high-pressure forms of water were published by P.W. Bridgman in January 1912.

It is part of one of the inner layers of Titan.

Properties 
Ice VI has a density of 1.31 g/cm3 and a tetragonal crystal system with the space group P42/nmc; its unit cell contains  10 water molecules and has the dimensions a=6.27 Å and c=5.79 Å.
The triple point of ice VI with ice VII and liquid water is at about 82 °C and 2.22 GPa and its triple point with ice V and liquid water is at 0.16 °C and 0.6324 GPa = 6324 bar.

Ice VI undergoes phase transitions into ices XV and XIX  upon cooling depending on pressure as hydrochloric acid is doped.

See also 
 Ice phases (overview)

External links 
 Physik des Eises (PDF in German, iktp.tu-dresden.de)
 Ice phases (www.idc-online.com)

References 

Water ice